Adele Jergens (November 26, 1917 – November 22, 2002) was an American actress.

Early life and career

Born in Brooklyn, New York, as Adele Louisa Jurgens (some sources say Jurgenson), she rose to prominence in the late 1930s when she was named "Miss World's Fairest" at the 1939 New York World's Fair. In the early 1940s, she briefly worked as a Rockette and was named the number-one showgirl in New York City.

After a few years of working as a model and chorus girl, including being an understudy to Gypsy Rose Lee in the Broadway show Star and Garter in 1942, Jergens landed a movie contract with Columbia Pictures in 1944, with brunette Jergens becoming a blonde.

At the beginning of her career, she had roles in movies in which she was usually cast as a blonde floozy or burlesque dancer, as in Down to Earth starring Rita Hayworth (1947) and  The Dark Past starring William Holden (1948).

She played Marilyn Monroe's mother in Ladies of the Chorus (1948) despite being only nine years older than Monroe. She played an exotic dancer in Armored Car Robbery, and a criminal's girl in Try and Get Me (both 1950) and appeared in the movie Abbott and Costello Meet the Invisible Man (1951).

She had a part in The Cobweb (1955), directed by Vincente Minnelli and starring Richard Widmark and Lauren Bacall. She worked in the 1950s radio show Stand By for Crime as Glamourpuss Carol Curtis with her real-life husband Glenn Langan as Chuck Morgan.

Personal life and death
In 1949, while filming Treasure of Monte Cristo, a film noir set in San Francisco, she met and married co-star Glenn Langan. Jergens and Langan remained married until his death from lymphoma on January 26, 1991, at age 73.

They had one child, a son named Tracy Langan, who eventually worked in Hollywood behind the scenes as a film technician. Tracy died of a brain tumor in 2001.

Death
Adele Jergens-Langan, who retired from the screen in 1956, died on November 22, 2002, from pneumonia in her Camarillo, California, home. Her death came just four days before her 85th birthday.

She was buried beside her husband and son at Oakwood Memorial Park Cemetery in Chatsworth, California, under the headstone marked Langan.

Selected filmography

 Hello Frisco, Hello (1943) – Chorine (uncredited)
 Sweet Rosie O'Grady (1943) – Diner at Delmonico's / Chorus Girl (uncredited)
 Jane Eyre (1943) – Woman at Party (uncredited)
 The Gang's All Here (1943) – Chorus Girl (uncredited)
 Pin Up Girl (1944) – Canteen Worker (uncredited)
 Black Arrow (1944) – Mary Brent
 Dancing in Manhattan (1944) – Darnelle (uncredited)
 Together Again (1944) – Gilda LaVerne (uncredited)
 Tonight and Every Night (1945) – Showgirl (uncredited)
 A Thousand and One Nights (1945) – Princess Armina
 State Fair (1945) – Girl on Rollercoaster (uncredited)
 Fallen Angel (1945) – Woman at Madley's Show (uncredited)
 She Wouldn't Say Yes (1945) – Allura
 The Corpse Came C.O.D. (1947) – Mona Harrison
 Down to Earth (1947) – Georgia Evans
 When a Girl's Beautiful (1947) – Adele Jordan
 Blondie's Anniversary (1947) – Gloria Stafford
 The Prince of Thieves (1948) – Lady Christabel
 I Love Trouble (1948) – Boots Nestor
 The Woman from Tangier (1948) – Nylon
 The Fuller Brush Man (1948) – Miss Sharmley
 The Dark Past (1948) – Laura Stevens
 Ladies of the Chorus (1948) – Mae Martin
 Slightly French (1949) – Yvonne La Tour
 Law of the Barbary Coast (1949) – Lita
 The Crime Doctor's Diary (1949) – Inez Gray
 Make Believe Ballroom (1949) – Adele Jergens
 The Mutineers (1949) – Norma Harrison
 Treasure of Monte Cristo (1949) – Jean Turner
 The Traveling Saleswoman (1950) – Lilly
 Radar Secret Service (1950) – Lila
 Blonde Dynamite  (1950) – Joan Marshall
 Side Street (1950) – Lucille 'Lucky' Colner
 Everybody's Dancin' (1950) – Adele Jergens
 Beware of Blondie (1950) – Toby Clifton
 Armored Car Robbery (1950) – Yvonne LeDoux
 Edge of Doom (1950) – Irene
 Blues Busters (1950) – Lola Stanton
 The Sound of Fury (1950) – Velma
 Sugarfoot (1951) – Reva Cairn
 Abbott and Costello Meet the Invisible Man (1951) – Boots Marsden
 Show Boat (1951) – Cameo McQueen (uncredited)
 Aaron Slick from Punkin Crick (1952) – Gladys
 Somebody Loves Me (1952) – Nola Beach
 Overland Pacific (1954) – Jessie Loraine
 Fireman Save My Child (1954) – Harry's Wife
 The Miami Story (1954) – Gwen Abbott
 The Big Chase (1954) – Doris Grayson
 Strange Lady in Town (1955) – Bella Brown
 Outlaw Treasure (1955) – Rita Starr
 The Cobweb (1955) – Miss Cobb
 The Lonesome Trail (1955) – Mae
 Day the World Ended (1955) – Ruby
 Girls in Prison (1956) – Jenny
 Fighting Trouble (1956) – Mae Randle
 Runaway Daughters (1956) – Dixie Jackson

References

External links

 
 
 Adele Jergens Los Angeles Times Obituaries

American film actresses
Burials at Oakwood Memorial Park Cemetery
Musicians from Brooklyn
1917 births
2002 deaths
American female dancers
Dancers from New York (state)
Actresses from New York City
20th-century American actresses
20th-century American musicians
American radio actresses
American television actresses
20th-century American dancers
Columbia Pictures contract players
Deaths from pneumonia in California